Garfield House may refer to:

Garfield House (South Pasadena, California), listed on the NRHP in Los Angeles County, California
Garfield Farm and Inn Museum, St. Charles, Illinois, NRHP-listed as "Garfield Farm and Tavern"
Sims-Garfield Ranch, Ryegate, Montana, listed on the NRHP in Golden Valley County, Montana
Halsey Garfield House, Sheffield, Ohio, listed on the NRHP in Lorain County, Ohio
James A. Garfield House, Hiram, Ohio, listed on the NRHP in Portage County, Ohio
Milton Garfield House, Sheffield, Ohio, listed on the NRHP in Lorain County, Ohio
Garfield-Broad Apartments, Columbus, Ohio, listed on the NRHP in Columbus, Ohio
James A. Garfield National Historic Site, Mentor, Ohio, NRHP-listed
A sketch in the first season of I Think You Should Leave with Tim Robinson

See also
Garfield Building (disambiguation)
Garfield Park (disambiguation)
Garfield Historic District (disambiguation)
Garfield Library (disambiguation)
Garfield School (disambiguation)